Neal Bascomb (born 1971) is an American journalist and author. He is known for his books on popular history.

Early life and education
He graduated Phi Beta Kappa from Miami University with a B.A. in Economics and English Literature.

Career 
After graduation, he worked as a journalist in London, Paris, and Dublin. He was an editor for St. Martin's Press, and in 2000, he began writing books full-time. His books have ranked on a number of bestseller lists, been optioned for film, and been published in over 15 countries. He has contributed to the New York Times, Wall Street Journal, and the Los Angeles Times.

Personal life 
He currently lives in Philadelphia, Pennsylvania.

Books

References

External links

Bookpage interview article

American male writers
Living people
1971 births
Miami University alumni